Empirical psychology is the work of a number of nineteenth century German-speaking pioneers of experimental psychology, including William James, Wilhelm Wundt and others. It also includes several philosophical theories of psychology which based themselves on the epistemological standpoint of empiricism, e.g., Franz Brentano's Psychology from an Empirical Standpoint (1874).

See also
 History of psychology
Cognitive psychology
Behavioural psychology

References
 Wilhelm Wundt (1897), Outlines of Psychology (Grundriss der Psychologie).
 E. B. Titchener, "Brentano and Wundt: Empirical and Experimental Psychology", The American Journal of Psychology, 32(1) (Jan. 1921), pp. 108–120.

Psychological schools
History of psychology